The dagger alif or superscript alif is written as a short vertical stroke on top of an Arabic letter. The dagger alif occurs in only a few modern words, but these include some common ones; it is seldom written, however, even in fully vocalised texts, except in the Qur'an. As Wright notes "[alif] was at first more rarely marked than the other long vowels, and hence it happens that, at a later period, after the invention of the vowel-points, it was indicated in some very common words merely by a fatḥa [i.e. the dagger alif.]" Most keyboards do not have dagger alif. The word  is usually produced automatically by entering "". The word consists of alif + ligature of doubled  with a shadda and a dagger alif above .

With fatḥah 
There are two possible ways of representing the dagger alif in modern editions of Quran. In the editions printed in the Middle East the dagger alif is written with fatḥah:  . In the editions printed in South Asia (Pakistan, India and Bangladesh) the dagger alif is written without fatḥah:  .

See also 
 Arabic diacritics

References 

Arabic diacritics
Arabic words and phrases
Quranic orthography
Phonetic guides